Lophotis is a genus of bustard in the family Otididae. The genus contains three species, all found in Africa. All three species are sometimes placed in the genus Eupodotis, and are closely related to that genus and the genus Afrotis. One distinctive feature of the genus is a pink retractile crest.

Species

References

 
Taxa named by Ludwig Reichenbach